Hovvdy is an American Indie pop duo from Austin, Texas.

History
The duo began their career releasing an EP in 2014. The following year, they released a split with the band Loafer. Hovvdy released their debut album, Taster, in 2016. In 2018, Hovvdy released their second full-length album titled Cranberry. In 2019, the duo released a split with musician Hannah Read, known as Lomelda. The split found Hovvdy and Lomelda covering each others songs. The two also went on a summer tour to promote the split. The duo's third album, Heavy Lifter, was released in 2019. The bands fourth album, True Love, was released on October 1, 2021.

Discography
Albums
Taster - Double Double Whammy, 12" LP, CD, MP3 (2016)
Cranberry - Double Double Whammy, 12" LP, CD, MP3 (2018)
Heavy Lifter - Double Double Whammy (US) / Specialist Subject Records (UK), 12" LP, CD, MP3  (2019)
True Love - Grand Jury Music (2021)

Extended plays
ep - Drip Tapes/Merdurhaus, Cassette, MP3 (2014)
Stay Warm split with Loafer - Merdurhaus, Cassette, MP3 (2015)
Covers split with Lomelda - Self Released, Cassette, MP3 (2019)
Covers 2 - Self Released, MP3 (2021)
billboard for my feelings - Self Released (2022)

Singles
Meg - Merdurhaus, MP3 (2016)
Problem - Merdurhaus, MP3 (2016)
Easy / Turns Blue - Saddle Creek, MP3 (2018)
Runner - self released (2020)
I'm Sorry - self released (2020)

References

Musical groups from Austin, Texas
Musical groups established in 2014
Specialist Subject Records artists
2014 establishments in Texas
American indie rock groups